Young One from Sabudara is a 1958 Soviet drama film directed by Shota Managadze.

Plot 
Almost all the inhabitants of the village of Sabudara moved to the city, but the Kvernadze family wants to stay in their native lands. One guy from this family learns that his lover's family decides to leave and he leaves home...

Cast 
 Bela Mirianashvili as Tebrole
 Imedo Kakhiani as Gogita
 Givi Tokhadze as Ushangi
 Sesilia Takaishvili as Elpite
 Meri Kandelaki as Nino (as M. Kandelaki)
 Grigol Tkabladze as Sachino
 Ipolite Khvichia as Almaskhani
 Zurab Laperadze as Giorgi (as Zura Laperadze)
 Nodar Mgaloblishvili

References

External links 
 

1958 films
1950s Russian-language films
Soviet drama films
1958 drama films